The 1952 UK & Ireland Greyhound Racing Year was the 27th year of greyhound racing in the United Kingdom and Ireland.

Roll of honour

Summary
The annual totalisator was £64,263,725, which indicated that the industry had stabilised following a few turbulent years.

The year focused on the performances of two greyhounds, Endless Gossip and Magourna Reject. Despite the fact that Magourna Reject had failed to land a classic competition during the year, he drew the crowds everywhere he went and Endless Gossip was denied the chance to win the Triple Crown because the Scottish Greyhound Derby had been cancelled.

Competitions
Match racing was still popular even twenty years after the Mick the Miller era. One such match was between XPDNC (the Grand National champion against this year's favourite Lambourn Blackflash. Lambourn Blackflash won by five lengths and both competed in the Grand National at White City during May. The two rivals qualified for the final, but it was a 20-1 shot (Whistling Laddie) who upset the odds beating Lambourn Blackflash by one and a quarter lengths, XPDNC finished fifth in the first Grand National to contain six dogs.

The National Intertrack Championship sponsored by the News of the World was won by Eastville after the Bristol track defeated Bradford 19–11. Endless Gossip travelled to Cardiff Arms Park after winning the 1952 English Greyhound Derby and added the Welsh Greyhound Derby final defeating a field including Magourna Reject, Ballylanigan Tanist and Drumman Rambler.

Monachdy Girlie trained by Jimmy Jowett, won the Scurry Gold Cup and Endless Gossip then won the Laurels at Wimbledon Stadium which now offered £1,000 to the winner. Magourna Reject was switched to the longer distances but failed to win both the Cesarewitch and St Leger and looked destined to never win a classic race. Monachdy Girlie won a second classic after a dead heat in the Oaks
The Grand Prix competition was not run due to insufficient entries.

Tracks
The Abbey Stadium in Swindon opened on 1 November. The stadium was opened by the Bristol Greyhound Racing Association, soon to change their name to Bristol Stadium Ltd and they also took control of affairs at Oxford Stadium, following the death of Managing Director Leslie Calcutt.

News
Trainer Stan Biss died after suffering a stroke and failing to recover and the well-respected Managing Director of Catford Stadium, Frank Sutton also died. Sutton had introduced the British Breeders Produce Stakes. Laughing Lieutenant was the first stud dog to fly to Ireland for breeding purposes and trainer Jack Tallantire joined the New Cross Stadium training ranks.

The National Greyhound Racing Club made the weighing of greyhounds before a race compulsory.

Ireland
Racing in Ireland was experiencing a boom as attendances flocked to see the racing. A greyhound called Rough Waters had spent 1951 flapping (racing on independent tracks), in Scotland before being aimed towards Shelbourne Park and the Irish Greyhound Derby. Owned by one of Ireland's leading bookmakers Jimmy Lalor and trained by his brother Henry, the brindle went on to win the Derby final.

Principal UK races

+Track Record

	

Dead-heat

Totalisator returns

The totalisator returns declared to the licensing authorities for the year 1952 are listed below. Tracks that did not have a totalisator in operation are not listed.

References 

Greyhound racing in the United Kingdom
Greyhound racing in the Republic of Ireland
UK and Ireland Greyhound Racing Year
UK and Ireland Greyhound Racing Year
UK and Ireland Greyhound Racing Year
UK and Ireland Greyhound Racing Year